Fick may refer to:
 Adolf Eugen Fick (1829–1901), German physiologist, after whom are named:
 Fick principle, technique for measuring the cardiac output
 Fick's law of diffusion, describing the diffusion
 tonometer, both useful in music and ophthalmology
 Adolf Gaston Eugen Fick (1852–1937), German ophthalmologist nephew of Adolf Eugen Fick, inventor of the contact lens.
 August Fick (1833–1916), German philologist
 Carl Fick (1918–1990), American author and director
 Chuckie Fick (born 1985), American baseball player
 Emil Fick (1863–1930), Swedish fencer
 Franz Ludwig Fick (1813–1858), German anatomist
 Jacob Fick (1912–2004), German SS officer
 John Fick (1921–1958), American baseball player
 Leonard J. Fick (1915–1990), American Catholic priest
 Nathaniel Fick (born 1977), US Marine Corps officer
 Peter Fick (1913–1980), American swimmer
 Robert Fick (born 1974), American baseball player
 Roderich Fick (1886–1955), German architect
 Sigrid Fick (1887–1979), Swedish tennis player

See also 
 Ficken
 Fuck (disambiguation)

German-language surnames
Surnames from given names